Phoenix Labs is a Canadian video game developer based in Vancouver, British-Columbia. The company was founded in April 2014 by former Riot Games developers Jesse Houston, Sean Bender, and Robin Mayne. The studio's first project, Dauntless, launched in open beta on Microsoft Windows in May 2018 and has been released on PC, PlayStation 4, and Xbox One on May 21, 2019 and released on Nintendo Switch on December 10, 2019.

History 
Phoenix Labs was founded in 2014 by Jesse Houston, Sean Bender, and Robin Mayne, all former developers with Riot Games. The founders were joined by former Bioware, Riot Games, Capcom, and Blizzard Entertainment developers. The first 23 of the studio's employees had all shipped games with Houston previously.

In February 2018, Phoenix Labs opened its first US studio in San Mateo, California 

In February 2018, Phoenix Labs received Series B funding from tech investors including Sapphire Ventures, GGV, Next Frontier, and MTGx, though they maintained independent control of the studio. Throughout Dauntless''' development and pre-release, the company encouraged back and forth conversations between developers and players. Game designers, directors, and executives all connect with players regularly through forums and social media. Since the game's beta release, the studio has continued to make changes based on player feedback and discussion. For example, Dauntless originally featured a paid loot boxes system called "Chroma Cores," which were removed after they received negative feedback from players.

In July 2018, Phoenix Labs announced that Dauntless had reached 2 million registered accounts. The studio raised another round of funding in October 2018, led by Sapphire Ventures, intended to help expand the live service operations of Dauntless. In December 2018 Phoenix Labs launched a season pass feature called Hunt Pass, a series of challenges that promise limited-time rewards while the season lasts.

The studio had originally promised a PlayStation 4 and Xbox One launch for Dauntless in April 2019, though this date was later pushed to summer 2019. The game officially launched on consoles on September 26, 2019.

On January 29, 2020, Garena announced the acquisition of Phoenix Labs for an estimated US$150 million.

On December 2, 2020 Phoenix Labs announced it was opening two new offices in Los Angeles, California and Montreal, Quebec.

 Games developed 

 Epic Games store criticism 
In January 2019, Phoenix Labs announced partnership with Epic Games which made Dauntless available on PC exclusively through the Epic Games store and required all players to sign in using an Epic Games account.

While the move to make Dauntless'' an Epic Games store exclusive received criticism, Mayne cited cross-platform play as the partnership's main benefit.

References

External links 
 

Canadian companies established in 2014
Video game development companies
Video game companies of Canada
Video game companies established in 2014
Companies based in Vancouver
2020 mergers and acquisitions
Canadian subsidiaries of foreign companies